Sielec may refer to the following places:

Belarus 
Sialiec, Biaroza Raion (western Belarus)

Poland 

Sielec, Inowrocław County, Kuyavian-Pomeranian Voivodeship (north-central Poland)
Sielec, Żnin County, Kuyavian-Pomeranian Voivodeship (north-central Poland)
Sielec, Gmina Opoczno, Łódź Voivodeship (central Poland)
Sielec, Gmina Żarnów, Łódź Voivodeship (central Poland)
Sielec, Lublin Voivodeship (east Poland)
Sielec, Grójec County, Masovian Voivodeship (east-central Poland)
Sielec, Płońsk County, Masovian Voivodeship (east-central Poland)
Sielec, Tarnobrzeg, Podkarpackie Voivodeship
Sielec, Podkarpackie Voivodeship
Sielec, Subcarpathian Voivodeship (south-east Poland)
Sielec, Busko County, Świętokrzyskie Voivodeship (south-central Poland)
Sielec, Jędrzejów County, Świętokrzyskie Voivodeship (south-central Poland)
Sielec, Staszów County, Świętokrzyskie Voivodeship (south-central Poland)
Sielec-Kolonia, Świętokrzyskie Voivodeship

Ukraine 
Sielec, Drohobych Raion in Lviv Oblast (western Ukraine)

See also
Sielecki, a Polish surname